Herbie Mann at the Village Gate is a 1961 live album by jazz flutist Herbie Mann which was his third album for Atlantic Records, the main label for much of his career. The album was recorded at legendary club The Village Gate.

Reception
AllMusic awarded the album 4½ stars with its review stating "At the Village Gate is the album that first brought Herbie Mann to widespread popular attention, thanks to the inclusion of "Comin' Home Baby," which soon became one of the flautist's signature songs. By the time of the record's release in 1962, however, Mann had already been a bandleader for years, honing his pioneering blend of Afro-Cuban and Brazilian music with hard bop's funky structures just under the public radar. As a result, At the Village Gate sounds more like a summation than a beginning".

Track listing

Side One
"Comin' Home, Baby" (Ben Tucker) (8:37)
"Summertime" (DuBose Heyward, Ira Gershwin, and George Gershwin) (10:18)

Side Two
"It Ain't Necessarily So" (George and Ira Gershwin) (19:55)

Personnel
Herbie Mann - flutes
Hagood Hardy - vibraharp
Ahmed Abdul-Malik - bass
Ray Mantilla - conga and percussion
Chief Bey - African drum and percussion
Rudy Collins - drums
Ben Tucker - additional bass (and solo) on "Comin' Home"
Willis Conover - liner notes

Charting
The album peaked at 30 on The Billboard 200.

References

Herbie Mann live albums
1961 live albums
Albums produced by Nesuhi Ertegun
Albums recorded at the Village Gate